Hang Tuah Jaya is a planned area in the Malaysian state of Malacca created by its government as the state's administrative centre and smart city with economical, social, infrastructural and recreational developments. The area became a municipality on 1 January 2010 and governed by the Hang Tuah Jaya Municipal Council (MPHTJ), which is headquartered at Melaka Mall in Ayer Keroh, opposite the headquarters of the Malacca City Council along Lebuh Ayer Keroh.

Etymology 
Hang Tuah Jaya is named after the legendary Malay warrior – Hang Tuah and its name is a combination of the warrior's name with "jaya", a Sanskrit word adopted into Malay language which means "success" or "victory".

History 
Before 2010, Hang Tuah Jaya was administered by the Hang Tuah Jaya Corporation (PHTJ), a state government agency which was established on 1 June 2005 and headquartered at Melaka International Trade Centre (MITC) to oversee its development. After Hang Tuah Jaya Municipal Council became the local government of Hang Tuah Jaya, Hang Tuah Jaya Corporation was rebranded as the Malacca Green Technology Corporation (MGTC or PTHM) on 8 November 2013.

Administrative area 
The administrative area consists of parts of the following mukims:

Melaka Tengah District
Ayer Molek
Bachang
Batu Berendam
Bukit Baru
Bukit Katil
Peringgit
Jasin District
Ayer Panas
Kesang
Alor Gajah District
Durian Tunggal

Mukim can be either a subdivision of a district or a subdivision of sub-district (Section 11(c) of the National Land Code 1965).

See also
 Hang Tuah Jaya Municipal Council
 Putrajaya
 Iskandar Puteri
 Malacca City
 Alor Gajah
 Jasin (town)

References

External links
Hang Tuah Jaya Municipal Council

Populated places in Malacca
Planned cities in Malaysia